Padeh-ye Musa Khan (also Romanized as Padeh-ye Mūsá Khān; also known as Kārīzcheh and Padeh-ye Ḩoseyn Kūr) is a village in Jannatabad Rural District, Salehabad County, Razavi Khorasan Province, Iran. At the 2006 census, its population was 359, in 76 families.

References 

Populated places in   Torbat-e Jam County